Jeffrey Scuffins (June 16, 1962 - March 20, 2021) was a former distance runner. He set a course record at the 1987 Marine Corps Marathon which still stands.

Running career

High school
Scuffins attended North Hagerstown High School, where he ran cross country and track. In 1980, he set the school and county record in the boy's 1600 meters at 4:18.84. The Hagerstown county record stood for 32 years until it was broken by Williamsport High School runner Evan Hardy in 2012.

Collegiate
After graduating from North Hagerstown, Scuffins attended Clemson University, where he graduated in 1985. He finished among the top 100 men at the 1984 NCAA DI Cross Country Championships.

Post-collegiate
On May 25, 1985, he was the men's winner over runner-up Sosthenes Bitok at the Travel Run 10K run in Crystal City in a time of 29:13. He was given $2,500 in prize money for the victory. On November 8, 1987, Scuffins finished in first place among men at the Marine Corps Marathon, setting a course record of 2:14:01. His first half marathon split was 1:06:49, with the race temperature hovering above 60 degrees fahrenheit.

Honors 
Scuffins was inducted into the Marine Corps Marathon Hall of Fame in 2008 for his course record of 2:14:01.

Death 
Jeff was found dead in his Williamsport, MD apartment the morning of Saturday, March 20, 2021, according to his friends. The cause of death was unknown.

References

American male long-distance runners
1962 births
Living people